Wongravee Nateetorn (born 25 June 1998), better known as Sky, is a Thai actor known for playing Pala in the television series Hormones in 2015. He became famous after his role as Chalam in the series My Ambulance (2019).

Career
He entered the entertainment industry from the competition Hormones The Next Gen in 2013. After signing with Nadao Bangkok, he has been taking part in several dramas such as ThirTEEN Terrors (2014), Hormones: The Series (2015), Project S: Side by Side (2017) and My Ambulance (2019).

Filmography

Television series

References

External links
 
 

1998 births
Living people
Wongravee Nateetorn
Wongravee Nateetorn
Wongravee Nateetorn